Ellen Ware Geer is an American actress, professor, and theatre director.

Personal life
Geer was born in New York City, the daughter of actors Herta Ware and Will Geer. Her father was best-known for playing Grandpa Zebulon "Zeb" Walton on The Waltons. 

She is married to children's musician Peter Alsop, and was previously married to actor Ed Flanders. She and Flanders had a son, Ian Geer Flanders. She and Alsop have two daughters, Megan and Willow.

Career

In 1963, Geer joined the Minnesota Theatre Company for the opening seasons of the original Tyrone Guthrie Theatre in Minneapolis, where, among other roles, she played the lead in Guthrie's production of Bernard Shaw's Saint Joan. 

Geer began her film career appearing as a nun in the 1968 Richard Lester drama Petulia.  She followed this with an appearance in 1969's The Reivers with her father, Will Geer.

In 1971, Geer played the deceased wife of the lead character in Kotch, appearing throughout the movie in flashbacks. That same year, she became a regular on The Jimmy Stewart Show (which aired until the following year) and had a supporting role in the acclaimed comedy Harold and Maude. In 1974, she starred in two films which she also wrote: Silence and Memory of Us, both of which featured her father.

The remainder of Geer's 1970s career consisted primarily of guest appearances and made-for-television movies. Television series on which she appeared during this time included Police Story, The Streets of San Francisco, Baretta, Barnaby Jones, Charlie's Angels, CHiPs and two episodes of Fantasy Island.

Her television movie credits during this time included Babe (1975), The Lindbergh Kidnapping Case (1976), The Trial of Lee Harvey Oswald (1977) and A Shining Season (1979). The only theatrical film on which she worked in the late 1970s was Jonathan Kaplan's Over the Edge in 1979.

The remainder of her television credits include guest appearances in the Star Trek: The Next Generation episode "Silicon Avatar", The Waltons, Quincy, M.E., Dallas, The Practice, Stingray, CSI: Crime Scene Investigation, ER, NYPD Blue and Cold Case. She also had recurring roles on Falcon Crest and Beauty and the Beast. She played elderly Piper Halliwell on the WB series Charmed in the series finale. In October 2007, the actress returned briefly to Desperate Housewives which she briefly appeared in before.  She appeared in the fourth season of Castle in the episode called "The Blue Butterfly".

Geer has served since 1978 as artistic director of the Will Geer Theatricum Botanicum, a professional repertory, open-air theater in Topanga Canyon, California. Geer has also served as a visiting associate professor, teaching acting, at the University of California, Los Angeles School of Theater for 12 years.

Filmography

Film

Television

References

External links
 
 

20th-century American actresses
21st-century American actresses
Actresses from New York City
American film actresses
American film directors
American television actresses
American theatre directors
Women theatre directors
Living people
Educators from New York City
American women educators
Screenwriters from New York (state)
UCLA School of Theater, Film and Television faculty
Year of birth missing (living people)